Aad van den Hoek (born 14 October 1951) is a former Dutch cyclist. He was professional between 1974 and 1983 and was good friends with Gerrie Knetemann.

Biography
In 1976 he finished last in the final of the Tour de France and carried the Lanterne rouge.

In 1972 he finished third in the 100 km team time trial at the Munich Olympics, but tested positive for Coramine, a drug allowed by the Union Cycliste Internationale but not the IOC. The Dutch team was disqualified.

Major results

1974
Rheinland-Pfalz Rundfahrt
1976
Eight days of Chaam
Star of Promises (Etoile d'Espoirs)
1977
7th stage Part B Route du Sol
1978
1st leg Part B Tour of Netherlands

See also
 List of Dutch Olympic cyclists
List of doping cases in cycling

References

External links
 
 
 
 

1951 births
Living people
Dutch male cyclists
Dutch sportspeople in doping cases
Doping cases in cycling
People from Dirksland
Competitors stripped of Summer Olympics medals
Cyclists at the 1972 Summer Olympics
Olympic cyclists of the Netherlands
UCI Road World Championships cyclists for the Netherlands
Cyclists from South Holland
20th-century Dutch people